Patrick Henry Reardon is an archpriest of the Antiochian Orthodox Christian Archdiocese, author, lecturer, podcaster, and senior editor of Touchstone.

Reardon began his theological education at Southern Baptist Theological Seminary in Louisville, Kentucky, then attended St. Anselm's College, and the Pontifical Biblical Institute in Rome, Italy, followed later at St. Tikhon's Orthodox Seminary in South Canaan, Pennsylvania.

Reardon came to national attention in 2015 when he announced he was refusing to sign any marriage licenses issued by the state of Illinois, owing to the state's complicity in the redefinition of marriage. 

Reardon is a prolific writer as well as a popular pastor, homilist, and teacher. Until his retirement in 2020, he served as pastor at All Saints Antiochian Orthodox Church in Chicago. He is author of more than 500 articles, editorials, and reviews in numerous popular and scholarly journals, including more than 200 for Touchstone Magazine. He is also the author of twelve books, including works on the biblical books of Genesis, Numbers, 1-2 Chronicles, Job, Psalms, Sirach, Romans, and Revelation.

Most of his books were published by Ancient Faith Publishing, and his podcasts are hosted by Ancient Faith Radio.

Books
Christ in the Psalms (2000)
Christ in His Saints  (2004)
The Trial of Job: Orthodox Christian Reflections on the Book of Job (2005)
Chronicles of History and Worship: Orthodox Christian Reflections on the Books of Chronicles (2006)
Creation and the Patriarchal Histories: Orthodox Reflections on the Book of Genesis (2008)
Wise Lives: Orthodox Christian Reflections on the Wisdom of Sirach (2009)
The Jesus We Missed: The Surprising Truth About the Humanity of Christ (2012)
Reclaiming the Atonement, Volume 1: The Incarnate Word (2015)
Revelation: A Liturgical Prophecy (2018)
Romans: An Orthodox Commentary (2018)
Out of Step with God: Orthodox Christian Reflections on the Book of Numbers (2019)
The History of Orthodox Christianity: Background Material For Instructors and Discussion Leaders (written to accompany a 90 minute film about the Orthodox Church)

References

External links
Father Patrick Henry Reardon
Fr. Patrick Reardon
All Saints Homilies (podcasts)
Pastoral Ponderings (weblog)

American Eastern Orthodox priests
Eastern Orthodox priests in the United States
Year of birth missing (living people)
Living people